Altid ballade (English: Nothing but trouble) is a 1955 Danish drama film directed by Gabriel Axel which focuses on a working-class family. The film was a remake of Edith Carlmar's 1954 film Aldri annet enn bråk, and Axel's début as a film director.

Sigrid Horne-Rasmussen received a Bodil Award for Best Actress in a Leading Role for her role as Helga Nielsen.

Cast 
 Sigrid Horne-Rasmussen
 Carl Heger
 Asbjørn Andersen
 Jørn Jeppesen
 Kai Holm
 Kirsten Passer
 Annie Birgit Hansen
 Karen Lykkehus
 Valsø Holm
 Birgit Sadolin

References

External links 
 
 

1955 films
Danish drama films
1955 drama films
Films directed by Gabriel Axel
Films scored by Sven Gyldmark
Remakes of Norwegian films
Danish black-and-white films
1950s Danish-language films